Encyclopaediæ, seu orbis disciplinarum, tam sacrarum quam prophanarum, epistemon is an early encyclopedia written in Latin by Zagreb born philosopher Paul Skalic. It was first published in Basel in 1559 and reprinted in Cologne, Germany in 1571. It is often considered to be the first encyclopedia to use the term encyclopedia in its title. This is not to be confused with the first appearance of the word which was disputed by Robert Collison who later reported that the work was poorly written, and that Joachim Sterck van Ringelbergh had used the word "cyclopaedia" to describe his work in 1541.

References

External links 
Encyclopaediae, seu Orbis disciplinarum, tam sacrarum quam prophanarum Pauli Scalichii (Pavao Skalić) (1559) at Internet Archive
Page images at the Muich Digitization Project

German encyclopedias
1559 books
Latin encyclopedias
16th-century encyclopedias
16th-century Latin books